Brown Bear Seamount is a seamount (underwater volcano) approximately  west of the coast of Oregon. It is connected to the larger Axial Seamount by a small ridge. Brown Bear Seamount was created by the Cobb hotspot, and is located on the near west of the Juan de Fuca Ridge. It has not been affected by ocean spreading as much as its neighbor, and is therefore not quite as geologically complex. Brown Bear is the second youngest volcano in the chain, after Axial. No eruptions are known.

References

External links 
 SBN entry

Seamounts of the Cobb–Eickelberg Seamount chain